Canscora is a genus 9 to 30 species of plants in the family Gentianaceae. Canscora is native to Africa, Asia and Australia. Some species are used medicinally.

Species
Species accepted by the Plants of the World Online as of November 2022:

Canscora alata 
Canscora andrographioides 
Canscora bhatiana 
Canscora bidoupensis 
Canscora ciathula 
Canscora concanensis 
Canscora diffusa 
Canscora heteroclita 
Canscora macrocalyx 
Canscora pauciflora 
Canscora perfoliata 
Canscora roxburghii 
Canscora schultesii 
Canscora shrirangiana 
Canscora stricta 
Canscora tetraptera

References

Gentianaceae
Gentianaceae genera